The Golden Goblet Award for Best Music (Chinese: 金爵奖最佳音乐) is a prize given to the films in the main category of competition at the Shanghai International Film Festival.

Award Winners

References

Film music awards
Shanghai International Film Festival